The 1st New York Regiment was authorized on 25 May 1775 and organized at New York City from 28 June to 4 August, for service with the Continental Army under the command of Colonel Alexander McDougall. The enlistments of the first establishment ended on 31 December 1775.

The second establishment of the regiment was authorized on 19 January 1776.

The regiment was involved in the Invasion of Canada, the Battle of Valcour Island, the Battle of Saratoga, the Battle of Monmouth, the Sullivan Expedition, and the Battle of Yorktown. The regiment was furloughed 2 June 1783 at Newburgh, New York and disbanded 15 November 1783.

References

Sources
 Égly, T. W., History of the First New York Regiment, 1775-1783, Hampton, NH: P.E. Randall, 1981
 Fernow, Berthold, New York in the Revolution, 1887
 Heitman, Francis B., Historical Register of Officers of the Continental Army during the War of the Revolution. New, enlarged, and revised edition., Washington, D.C.: Rare Book Shop Publishing Company, 1914
 Wright, Robert, The Continental Army, 1983

External links
Bibliography of the Continental Army in New York compiled by the United States Army Center of Military History

1st New York Regiment